Contraband (1940) is a wartime spy film by the British director-writer team of Michael Powell and Emeric Pressburger, which reunited stars Conrad Veidt and Valerie Hobson after their earlier appearance in The Spy in Black the previous year. On this occasion, Veidt plays a hero, something he did not do very often, and there is also an early (uncredited) performance by Leo Genn.

The title of the film in the United States was Blackout. Powell writes in his autobiography, A Life in Movies, as saying that the U.S. renaming was a better title and he wished he had thought of it.

Plot
It is November 1939: the Phoney War-stage of the World War II. Denmark is still neutral, but (Danish) Captain Andersen (Conrad Veidt) and his freighter Helvig are stopped in the English Channel by Lt. Commanders Ashton (Joss Ambler) and Ellis (Harold Warrender) for a cargo inspection in a British Contraband Control Port.

He receives two shore passes for himself and his First Officer Axel Skold (Hay Petrie) to dine with Ashton and Ellis, but the passes (and Helvigs motorboat) are stolen by passengers Mrs. Sorensen (Valerie Hobson) and talent scout Mr. Pidgeon (Esmond Knight). From a cut-out newspaper train schedule, Andersen is able to figure out they are taking a train to London and catches up with them; but, when the train arrives in the blacked-out metropolis, he is only able to hold on to Mrs. Sorensen.

He invites her to dine at the restaurant of Skold's brother Erik (also Hay Petrie). Then she takes him to the home of her aunt, where they are captured by a Nazi spy ring led by Van Dyne (Raymond Lovell), a man Mrs. Sorensen has already had unpleasant dealings with in Düsseldorf, Germany. Van Dyne knows Mrs. Sorensen and Pidgeon are British agents. Van Dyne finds a message hidden on one of Mrs. Sorensen's cigarette papers, identifying her as "M47" and listing the names of neutral ships under which two German vessels are traveling. He decides to replace one of the names with that of an American ship to cause trouble, the United States being neutral at this time. Mrs. Sorensen and Andersen are tied up, but the captain manages to escape. He brings back reinforcements in the form of Erik Skold's staff and is able to free Mrs. Sorensen and knock out Van Dyne. With everything cleared up, Capt. Andersen and Mrs. Sorensen resume their sea voyage.

Cast

Conrad Veidt as Capt. Andersen
Valerie Hobson as Mrs Sorensen 
Hay Petrie as Axel Skold/Erik Skold 
Joss Ambler as Lt. Cmdr. Ashton, RNR 
Raymond Lovell as Van Dyne 
Esmond Knight as Mr Pidgeon 
Charles Victor as Hendrick 
Phoebe Kershaw as Miss Lang 
Harold Warrender as Lt. Cmdr. Ellis, RN 
John Longden as Passport Officer 
Eric Maturin as Passport Officer 
Paddy Browne as Singer in "Regency"
Dennis Arundell as Lieman
Molly Hamley-Clifford as Baroness Hekla
Eric Berry as Mr Abo
Olga Edwardes as Mrs Abo

Cast notes
Leo Genn and Peter Bull as two of Van Dyne's associates
Bernard Miles in an amusing scene arguing with two air raid wardens
Esma Cannon as Hay Petrie's niece
Michael Shepley as the helpful man in the club
Milo O'Shea made his film debut, in the uncredited role of an air raid warden.

Production
Contraband was intended as a followup to Powell and Pressburger's The Spy in Black, which was filmed at the end of 1938, but was not released by Alexander Korda for almost a year. The current film was in production from 16 December 1939 through 27 January 1940  at Denham Film Studios, with location shooting in London at Chester Square in Belgravia, and in Ramsgate in Kent.

Critical reception
The TV Guide online review called it "An odd little comic thriller - who, except perhaps Michael Powell, would cast 47-year-old Cabinet of Dr. Caligari (1920) star Conrad Veidt as a light romantic hero?"

Time Out wrote that "Less stylish than The Spy in Black, this espionage thriller is more fun, with its tongue-in-cheek plot revelling in Hitchcockian eccentricities". Radio Times describes it as "A neat Second World War espionage thriller that depicts a London crawling with spies".

Dennis Schwartz of Ozus' World Movie Reviews had mixed feelings, giving it a grade of B-. "The brisk pace and its added touches of quaintness, made the film endearing  of the lack of any character study and the one-dimensional tone of the villains."  However, he wondered "how much better a more romantically inclined hero would have fared in his [Veidt's] role."

References

External links
 Contraband reviews and articles at the Powell & Pressburger Pages
 
 
 
 . Full synopsis and film stills (and clips viewable from UK libraries).

1940 films
1940s spy films
British spy films
1940s English-language films
British black-and-white films
World War II films made in wartime
World War II spy films
Films set in 1939
Films set in London
Films shot at Denham Film Studios
Films by Powell and Pressburger
Films scored by Richard Addinsell
British war films
1940s war films